WQHU-LP (105.5 FM, "Forester Radio") is a low-power FM radio station broadcasting a folk music format. Licensed to Huntington, Indiana, United States, the station is currently owned by Huntington University.

History
The Federal Communications Commission issued a construction permit for the station on July 10, 2001. The station was assigned the call sign WQHC-LP on September 13, 2001, and received its license to cover on November 12, 2002. On June 1, 2005, the station changed its call sign to the current WQHU-LP.

References

External links

 

Modern rock radio stations in the United States
QHU-LP
Radio stations established in 2002
QHU-LP
2002 establishments in Indiana